London Road is a popular road name in the United Kingdom.

London Road may also refer to:

Arts and entertainment
 London Road (album), a 2015 album by Modestep
 London Road (musical), a 2011 musical by Alecky Blythe and Adam Corke
London Road (film), a 2015 film adaptation of the musical

Cricket grounds
 London Road, High Wycombe
 London Road, Shrewsbury
 London Road, Sleaford

Other uses
 London Road, Lethbridge, a neighbourhood in Lethbridge, Alberta, Canada
 London Road railway station (disambiguation), the name of several stations
 London Road Stadium, in Peterborough, England

See also

"London Roads", a song by Lil Wayne from the 2015 Free Weezy Album